Anitrella is a frazione, or  territorial subdivision of a comune, of the Italian comune (municipality) of Monte San Giovanni Campano.

There was an important paper mill built by the counts Lucernari and ruled by the Ligurian family Piccardo.

Frazioni of the Province of Frosinone